Plaid Cymru leadership election may refer to:

 1981 Plaid Cymru presidential election
 1984 Plaid Cymru presidential election
 1991 Plaid Cymru presidential election
 2000 Plaid Cymru leadership election
 2003 Plaid Cymru leadership election
 2012 Plaid Cymru leadership election
 2018 Plaid Cymru leadership election